Abdullah Al-Zori Al-Dossary (born 13 August 1987) is a Saudi Arabian professional footballer who currently plays as a left back for Abha. He is the son of former Al-Nahda player Mohammed Al-Zori Al-Dossary.

Al-Zori began his career with Al-Nahda and joined Al-Hilal in 2006. Al-Zori won 15 titles with Al-Hilal between 2006 and 2018, and made 315 appearances for the club across all competitions. On 27 May 2018, he joined Al-Wehda on a free transfer. After one and a half seasons with the club, Al-Zori left Al-Wehda and joined Al-Shabab on 30 January 2020. On 28 January 2022, Al-Zori joined Abha on a six-month contract.

Al-Zori made 58 appearances for the Saudi national team between 2008 and 2018, being selected for two Arabian Gulf Cup squads and the 2015 AFC Asian Cup.

Career statistics

Club

International goals
Scores and results list Saudi Arabia's goal tally first.

Honours
Al Hilal:
 Saudi Professional League (5): 2007–08, 2009–10, 2010–11, 2016–17, 2017–18
 King Cup (2): 2015, 2017
 Crown Prince Cup (7): 2007–08, 2008–09, 2009–10, 2010–11, 2011–12, 2012–13, 2015–16
 Saudi Super Cup (1): 2015
 AFC Champions League: Runner-up 2014, 2017

International
Gulf Cup of Nations Runner-up (2): 2009, 2014

References

External links

slstat.com 

1987 births
Living people
Association football defenders
Sportspeople from Riyadh
Saudi Arabian footballers
Saudi Arabia youth international footballers
Saudi Arabia international footballers
Al-Nahda Club (Saudi Arabia) players
Al Hilal SFC players
Al-Wehda Club (Mecca) players
Al-Shabab FC (Riyadh) players
Abha Club players
Saudi Professional League players
2015 AFC Asian Cup players